The Ministry of Electricity and Renewable Energy of Egypt is the government ministry in charge of managing and regulating the generation, transmission, and distribution of electricity in Egypt. Its headquarters are in Cairo. The current minister is Mohamed Shaker. The ministry was established in 1964 with presidential decree No. 147.

Electric power stations
An agreement was made with Siemens, a German company, to implement power stations in Beni Suef, the New Administrative Capital, and Borollos by mid 2018.

High dams

The Aswan Dam, inaugurated in 1971, "can generate 10 billion kilowatt-hours annually.".

A new high dam to pump and store water to produce electricity in Ataka was in the works in mid 2017 in conjunction with Sinohydro, a Chinese company.

Nuclear power plant
In 2015, Egypt began negotiations with Russian company Rosatom, for building a nuclear power plant in Dabaa and by the end of 2016, the ministry and the company were in their final negotiations on the deal. By 2017, negotiations were completed.

Petrol discovery

Eni, an Italian company is working on the large petrol field discovered in Egypt in 2015.

Coal-fired plant
As anticipated a year before, in September, 2018, a 4.4 billion agreement was signed for the building of a 6.6 GW coal-power plant in Hamrawein, Egypt and would take at least six years to complete and become operational. The project was mothballed in 2020.

Ministers

See also

Energy in Egypt
Cabinet of Egypt
Aswan Dam

References

External links
Ministry of Electricity and Energy Official website
 International Atomic Energy Agency - Egypt 
 Egypt's Cabinet Database

Electricity
Ministry
Egypt